John Joseph Morris (12 June 1936 – 8 February 2013) was an Australian politician. Born in Wallsend, New South Wales, he was a founder of the Federated Liquor and Allied Industries Employees' Union before becoming its NSW Secretary and President and eventually the National President. In 1976 he was elected to the New South Wales Legislative Council as a Labor member. He left the Council in 1984 to contest the Australian Senate for New South Wales, in which he was successful. He remained in the Senate until he retired in 1990.

References

Australian Labor Party members of the Parliament of Australia
Members of the Australian Senate for New South Wales
Members of the Australian Senate
Members of the New South Wales Legislative Council
1936 births
2013 deaths
20th-century Australian politicians